Shashank Singh (born 21 November 1991) is an Indian cricketer who plays for Chhattisgarh. He made his List A debut on 10 December 2015 in the 2015–16 Vijay Hazare Trophy. In February 2017, he was bought by the Delhi Daredevils team for the 2017 Indian Premier League for 10 lakhs.

In December 2018, he was bought by the Rajasthan Royals in the player auction for the 2019 Indian Premier League. He made his first-class debut on 9 December 2019, for Chhattisgarh in the 2019–20 Ranji Trophy.

In February 2022, he was bought by the Sunrisers Hyderabad in the auction for the 2022 Indian Premier League tournament.

References

External links
 

1991 births
Living people
Indian cricketers
Chhattisgarh cricketers
Mumbai cricketers
Pondicherry cricketers
Sunrisers Hyderabad cricketers
Place of birth missing (living people)